Virginia's 93rd House of Delegates district elects one of the 100 members of the Virginia House of Delegates, the lower house of the state's bicameral legislature. The district is made up of parts of Newport News, Williamsburg, James City County, and York County.

The district is represented by Democrat Michael P. Mullin.

District officeholders

References

Virginia House of Delegates districts
Newport News, Virginia
Williamsburg, Virginia
James City County, Virginia
York County, Virginia